is a Japanese professional wrestling stable, based in the Pro Wrestling Noah (Noah) promotion. It was founded in 2019.

History

Formation
On the finals night of the 2019 edition of the Global Tag League from May 4, Kenoh, Masa Kitamiya, Atsushi Kotoge and Yoshiki Inamura allegedly founded the unit after they protested against Noah's new ownership under Lidet Entertainment.

Under Kenoh's leadership (2019–present)

At Noah Kawasaki Go on August 30, 2020, after he alongside "AXIZ" tag team partner Go Shiozaki dropped the GHC Tag Team Championship to Naomichi Marufuji and Masaaki Mochizuki, Katsuhiko Nakajima betrayed Shiozaki and alligned himself with Kongo after shaking hands with Kenoh.

At CyberFight Festival 2021 on June 6, Kenoh, Katsuhiko Nakajima, Manabu Soya, Haoh, Nioh and Tadasuke teamed up in a losing effort against Team DDT (Sanshiro Takagi, Akito, Kazusada Higuchi, Yukio Sakaguchi, Naomi Yoshimura and Yukio Naya) in five-way tag team competition.

At Noah Bumper Crop 2022 In Sendai on January 16, Haoh turned on the stable, and Kenoh and Manabu Soya unsuccessfully challenged M's Alliance (Keiji Muto and Naomichi Marufuji) for the GHC Tag Team Championship. At Noah Gain Control 2022 In Nagoya on February 23, Aleja, Hajime Ohara and Tadasuke defeated Hao, Junta Miyawaki and Kai Fujimura. Aleja began showing compassion towards real life brother Kai Fujimura, after stopping Tadasuke's attack on him. Two days later at "Noah Step Forwrard", after growing unsatisfied with Tadasuke's actions, Aleja decided to turn on Tadasuke, and left Kongo, defecting to "Noah Juniors", before reverting to his previous ring name "Alejandro". At Noah Great Voyage in Fukuoka 2022 on March 21, (Katsuhiko Nakajima, Kenoh, Manabu Soya and Masakatsu Funaki teamed up in a losing effort against Sugiura-gun (Hideki Suzuki, Kazushi Sakuraba, Kendo Kashin and Takashi Sugiura). On the first night of the Noah Majestic 2022 event from April 29, Hajime Ohara, Tadasuke and Shuji Kondo fell short to Los Perros del Mal de Japón (El Texano Jr., Nosawa Rongai and Super Crazy) and Nio fell short to Hao. On the second night from April 30, Hajime Ohara, Manabu Soya and Tadasuke defeated Funky Express (Akitoshi Saito, King Tany and Mohammed Yone), Masakatsu Funaki successfully retained the GHC National Championship against Simon Gotch, and Katsuhiko Nakajima and Kenoh unsuccessfully challenged Sugiura-gun (Hideki Suzuki and Takashi Sugiura) for the GHC Tag Team Championship. At Noah Dream On Final 2022 on May 21, Hajime Ohara, Hi69, Tadasuke and Shuji Kondo defeated Momo No Seishun Tag (Atsushi Kotoge and Daisuke Harada), Hao and Yo-Hey, Katsuhiko Nakajima, Manabu Soya and Masakatsu Funaki fell short to Sugiura-gun (Hideki Suzuki and Takashi Sugiura) and Masaaki Mochizuki, and Kenoh defeated Simon Gotch. At CyberFight Festival 2022 on June 12, Katsuhiko Nakajima teamed up with Atsushi Kotoge and Yoshiki Inamura to defeat Burning (Tetsuya Endo and Jun Akiyama) and Kazusada Higuchi, and Kenoh defeated Daisuke Sasaki. At Noah Destination 2022 on July 16, Katsuhiko Nakajima, Manabu Soya and Masakatsu Funaki fell short to Go Shiozaki, Kazuyuki Fujita and Takashi Sugiura, and Kenoh defeated Satoshi Kojima to win the GHC Heavyweight Championship. At Noah Departure 2022 on August 5, Katsuhiko Nakajima and Manabu Soya defeated Anthony Greene and Stallion Rogers, and Hajime Ohara, Hi69, Kenoh and Tadasuke fell short to Alejandro, El Hijo del Santo, Kaito Kiyomiya and Último Dragón. At Noah Grand Ship In Nagoya 2022 on September 25, Hajime Ohara, Hi69 and Tadasuke fell short to Alejandro, Extreme Tiger and Ninja Mack, Katsuhiko Nakajima and Masakatsu Funaki fell short to Kazuyuki Fujita and Keiji Muto, and Kenoh dropped the GHC Heavyweight Championship to Kaito Kiyomiya. At Noah Ariake Triumph 2022 on October 30, Hajime Ohara, Manabu Soya and Shuji Kondo defeated Alejandro, Extreme Tiger and Shuhei Taniguchi, Hi69 and Tadasuke unsuccessfully challenged Stinger (Atsushi Kotoge and Seiki Yoshioka) for the GHC Junior Heavyweight Tag Team Championship, Masakatsu Funaki defended the GHC National Championship against Kazushi Sakuraba, Katsuhiko Nakajima and Kenoh unsuccessfully challenged TakaKoji (Satoshi Kojima and Takashi Sugiura) for the GHC Tag Team Championship. At Noah Global Honored Crown 2022 on November 10, Hajime Ohara and Shuji Kondo defeated Atsushi Kotoge and Seiki Yoshioka to win the GHC Junior Heavyweight Tag Team Championship and Masakatsu Funaki dropped the GHC National Championship to El Hijo del Dr. Wagner Jr.. At Noah The Best 2022 on November 23, Hi69 and Tadasuke fell short to Funky Express (Akitoshi Saito and Mohammed Yone), Katsuhiko Nakajima, Kenoh and Manabu Soya fell short to Kaito Kiyomiya, Masa Kitamiya and Satoshi Kojima, and Hajime Ohara and Shuji Kondo dropped the GHC Junior Heavyweight Tag Team Championship to Atsushi Kotoge and Seiki Yoshioka. At N Innovation 2022 on December 23, Hajime Ohara, Shuji Kondo and Tadasuke fell short to Alejandro, Andy Wu and Ninja Mack.

At Noah The New Year 2023 on January 1, Hi69, Shuji Kondo and Tadasuke fell short to Alejandro, Dante Leon and Ninja Mack, Katsuhiko Nakajima, Masakatsu Funaki, Manabu Soya and Hajime Ohara got outmatched by Kazuyuki Fujita, Kendo Kashin, Nosawa Rongai and Hiroshi Hase, and Kenoh unsuccessfully challenged Kaito Kiyomiya for the GHC Heavyweight Championship. At The Great Muta Final "Bye-Bye" on January 22, Hajime Ohara and Hi69 defeated Atsushi Kotoge and Seiki Yoshioka, and Kenoh, Katsuhiko Nakajima, Masakatsu Funaki and Manabu Soya fell short to Sugiura-gun (El Hijo de Dr. Wagner Jr. & Takashi Sugiura), Kaito Kiyomiya and Satoshi Kojima.

New Japan Pro Wrestling (2022–present)
Due to Pro Wrestling Noah sharing a business partnership with New Japan Pro Wrestling, various members of the stable participated in the latter's biggest yearly event, the Wrestle Kingdom, usually on the second or third night dedicated to inter-promotional prizeless matches. At Wrestle Kingdom 16 on January 8, 2022, Katsuhiko Nakajima, Kenoh, Manabu Soya, Tadasuke, and Aleja fell short to Los Ingobernables de Japón (Tetsuya Naito, Shingo Takagi, Sanada, Bushi, and Hiromu Takahashi). At Wrestle Kingdom 17 on January 21, Tadasuke defeated Bushi, Manabu Soya defeated  Sanada, Katsuhiko Nakajima fell short to Shingo Takagi and Kenoh to Tetsuya Naito.

Members

Current members

Former members

Associates

Sub-groups

Current

Former

Timeline

Championships and accomplishments
Pro-Wrestling Basara
UWA World Trios Championship (1 time, current) – Kondo with Takuya Sugawara and Toru Owashi
Pro Wrestling Noah
GHC Heavyweight Championship (2 times) – Nakajima and Kenoh
GHC National Championship (3 times, current) – Kenoh (2) and Funaki
GHC Tag Team Championship (1 time) – Kitamiya and Nakajima
GHC Junior Heavyweight Tag Team Championship (1 time) – Ohara and Kondo
N-1 Victory
(2019) – Kenoh
(2020, 2021) – Nakajima
Jr. Team Game (2021) – Tadasuke, Aleja, Haoh & Nioh
 Pro Wrestling Illustrated
Ranked Katsuhiko Nakajima No. 32 of the top 500 singles wrestlers in the PWI 500 in 2022
Ranked Kenoh No. 118 of the top 500 singles wrestlers in the PWI 500 in 2022
Ranked Masakatsu Funaki No. 223 of the top 500 singles wrestlers in the PWI 500 in 2022
Ranked Masa Kitamiya No. 322 of the top 500 singles wrestlers in the PWI 500 in 2019

See also
Los Perros del Mal de Japón
Stinger (professional wrestling)
Sugiura-gun
Choukibou-gun

Notes

References

Pro Wrestling Noah teams and stables
Independent promotions teams and stables
Japanese promotions teams and stables